Semeru Stadium is a multi-purpose stadium in the town of Lumajang, Indonesia.  It is currently used mostly for football matches. The stadium has a capacity of 15,000 people After being renovated for the Pekan Olahraha Provinsi/ PORPROV VII (Provincial Sports Week), Semeru Stadium has National Standard .
Semeru stadium was formerly named Karya Jaya Stadium. In addition, the stadium is a stadium Lumajang community pride.

It is the home base of Semeru FC and PSIL Lumajang.

History
Pride of Lumajang stadium, previously being named SEMERU STADIUM DISTRICT OF LUMAJANG, the stadium  was named  Karya Jaya Lumajang Stadium

On the front page this stadium, there are also several sports fields. Among other things, tennis courts, basketball courts, volleyball and soccer field.
Every afternoon, many people exercise this stadium page.

In the past, the main door stadium facing east to Jl.Jend.A.Yani. But now, after the stadium was renovated, and Judah change the name, the stadium eventually changed facing westward, to Jl.Gajah MADA. Yag Jl.Jend.A.Yani while facing the back entrance or exit from the stadium.

Location
Gajah Mada Street, Kepuharjo,  Lumajang districts, Lumajang Regency, East Java 6731 - 0812-3456-569

Stadium Condition

References

Sports venues in Indonesia
Football venues in Indonesia
Multi-purpose stadiums in Indonesia
Buildings and structures in East Java